Christopher Loudon (born 19 May 1985) is a Scottish former professional darts player.

Career
Loudon began playing darts at four years of age, and throughout his childhood and early teens, competed in local and international youth tournaments with the British Darts Organisation (BDO). Loudon last played competitively for the BDO in February 2009, when he participated in the BDO 2009 Scottish Open. He reached his board semi-final in this event, which was later won by Tony O'Shea. 

After the tournament, Loudon decided to move to the Professional Darts Corporation (PDC). To date, his greatest achievement in the PDC is reaching the second round of the Blue Square, 2009 UK Open Darts tournament, held in Bolton, England.

In July 2010, Loudon was ranked 115th on the PDC Order of Merit. In separate ranked tournaments, he was ranked joint-79th in the 2010 PDC Player's Championship Order of Merit, and joint-64th in the Blue Square UK Open Order of Merit in 2009. In 2010, and in the same tournament, Loudon was ranked 95th, and therefore qualified to compete in the Riley's Darts Zones - UK Open Darts Championship for a second time.  On 3 June 2010, he played against Paul Whitworth in the first round and was subsequently defeated 6–5. 

In October 2010, Loudon decided to move back to the BDO.

Nickname
Loudon was interviewed on Scottish radio station in 2010 96.3 Rock Radio, and confirmed that he did not have an official walk-on music or darts nickname, but has been referred to as "Fingers" because he "works with computers and plays darts". The DJ then suggested the nickname "Stiff Little Fingers" (a reference to the Northern Irish punk rock band), and perhaps "something by them" for his walk-on music.

Personal life
Loudon is a cousin of Scottish professional footballers Darren Young and Derek Young.

Notable earnings, achievements and results to date

References

External links
Chris Loudon's profile and stats on Darts Database

Scottish darts players
1985 births
Living people
Professional Darts Corporation former pro tour players